New Hill may refer to:

 New Hill, West Virginia, an unincorporated community in Monongalia County, West Virginia, United States
 New Hill, North Carolina, an unincorporated community in Wake County, North Carolina, United States
 New Hill, Alberta, a settlement in Red Deer County, Alberta, Canada

See also 
 New Hill Historic District, a historic district located at New Hill, North Carolina
 New Chapel Hill, Texas,  a city in Smith County, Texas, United States